2MASS J12373919+6526148 (hereafter 2MASS 1237+6526) is a brown dwarf object with late spectral type T in the constellation of Draco, nearly 34 light-years away from the Sun. The substellar object could likely host a very low-mass companion (yet undetected but inferred), possibly in the planetary regime. This has been inferred from unusual Hα emission that it exhibited in the past.

2MASS 1237+6526 may potentially show aurorae, which would be significant since extrasolar aurorae have not been detected, but this has not been conclusively demonstrated.

Possible planetary companion

Burgasser et al. (2003) have inferred the presence of a low-mass companion orbiting the brown dwarf 2MASS 1237+6526. Such object would yield a mass between 3 and 12 times that of Jupiter and take nearly 4.56 hours (0.19 days) to revolve around its dim primary. If confirmed it would be one of the shortest period exoplanets and orbiting one of the faintest hosts so far. Accounting very faint luminosity of the primary (6.25/1,000,000th of Sun's luminosity), the habitable zone is located within 0.0025 astronomical units, so the putative planet could likely retain great amounts of water and ammonia. Moreover, both the objects would appear the same size.

References

T-type stars
Brown dwarfs
Hypothetical planetary systems
Draco (constellation)